Orthogonius spinosus is a species of ground beetle in the subfamily Orthogoniinae. It was described by Burgeon in 1937.

References

spinosus
Beetles described in 1937